Bellechasse was a federal electoral district in Quebec, Canada, that was represented in the House of Commons of Canada from 1867 until the 1997 election, when it became Bellechasse—Etchemins—Montmagny—L'Islet. After redistribution prior to the 2004 election, that riding became Lévis—Bellechasse. Currently, the only riding which includes the name "Bellechasse" is Bellechasse—Les Etchemins—Lévis.

Description
In 1867, Bellechasse was defined to consist of the Parishes of St. Valier, Saint Raphael, Saint Michel, Beaumont, Saint Charles, Saint Gervais, Saint Lazare, the south-west part of the Township of Armagh, the north-east part of the Township of Buckland, and the Townships of Mailloux, Roux, Bellechasse and Daaquam.

In 1882, the north-eastern part of the Township of Armagh in the County of Bellechasse, and the north-east part of the township of Mailloux were detached from Bellechasse and annexed to Montmagny.

In 1924, Bellechasse was re-defined to consist of the County of Bellechasse, except for the seigneuries of Lauzon and Joliette in the municipality of Honfleur, and the townships of Langevin and Ware in the municipality of Sainte-Sabine.

In 1933, Bellechasse was re-defined to consist of the county of Bellechasse (except the seigniories of Lauzon and Joliette, and the township of Langevin et Ware), the municipalities of Rivière-Boyer, St-Henri-de-Lauzon, St-Jean-Chrysostôme, and St-Henri Village in the county of Lévis, the parish municipality of St-Luc-de-Dijon in the county of Dorchester, and  the municipalities of Berthier and St-François-de-la-Rivière-du-Sud in the county of Montmagny.

In 1947, Bellechasse was re-defined to consist of the county of Bellechasse, the municipalities of Rivière-Boyer, St. Henri-de-Lauzon and the village of St. Henri in the county of Lévis, the municipality of St. Luc-de-Dijon the county of Dorchester, and the municipalities of Berthier and St. François-de-la-Rivière-du-Sud in the county of Montmagny.

In 1966, Bellechasse was re-defined to consist of the Town of Montmagny, the County of Bellechasse, parts of the County of Dorchester, and the County of Montmagny (except the municipality of Cap-Saint-Ignace).

In 1976, Bellechasse was re-defined to consist of the City of Montmagny, the Towns of Lac-Etchemin, L'Islet and Saint-Pamphile, the County of Montmagny, the County of L'Islet (except the parish municipality of Sainte-Louise and the municipality of Saint-Roch-des-Aulnets), parts of the Counties of Bellechasse and Dorchester.

In 1987,  Bellechasse was re-defined to consist of the towns of Lac-Etchemin, L'Islet, Montmagny and Saint-Pamphile, the counties of Bellechasse and Montmagny, the County of L'Islet (excluding the Parish Municipality of Sainte-Louise), the Municipality of Saint-Rochdes-Aulnaies, and parts of the County of Dorchester.

The electoral district was abolished in 1996, and was incorporated into 
Bellechasse—Etchemins—Montmagny—L'Islet.

Members of Parliament
This riding elected the following Members of Parliament:

Election results

See also
 List of Canadian federal electoral districts
 Past Canadian electoral districts

External links
Bellechasse electoral results

Former federal electoral districts of Quebec